is a small district of Shibuya, Tokyo, located to the southeast of Ebisu Station. The district is often perceived as a portion of the broad-sense Ebisu area. Ebisuminami borders Ebisu district in the narrow sense on the northwest across Ebisu Station, the mailing address for which is Ebisuminami, rather than Ebisu, Shibuya.

, built in 1975, in front of Ebisu Station's west exit is a landmark of the Ward of Shibuya.

The beverage company  is headquartered in Ebisu Minami 2-chōme.

Ward parks
Parks include:

Education
 operates public elementary and junior high schools.

Ebisuminami 1-chome 18-26-ban and 2-chome 12-18 and 20-31-ban are zoned to Kakezuka Elementary School (加計塚小学校) and Hiroo Junior High School (広尾中学校). Ebisuminami 3-chome, 1-chome 1-17-ban, and 2-chome 1-11 and 19-ban are zoned to Nagayato Elementary School (長谷戸小学校) and Hachiyama Junior High School (鉢山中学校).

References

Neighborhoods of Tokyo
Districts of Shibuya